Datuk Zakaria bin Mohd. Edris is a Malaysian politician who served as the Member of Parliament (MP) for Libaran from May 2018 to November 2022, State Assistant Minister of Housing and Local Government of Sabah in the Barisan Nasional (BN) administration under former Chief Minister Musa Aman from 2013 to 2018 and Member of the Sabah State Legislative Assembly (MLA) for Gum-Gum from March 2004 to May 2018. He is a member of Malaysian United Indigenous Party (BERSATU), a component party of the Perikatan Nasional (PN) and Gabungan Rakyat Sabah (GRS) coalitions and formerly Pakatan Harapan (PH) coalition and was a member of the United Malays National Organisation (UMNO), a component party of the BN coalition. He left UMNO to be an independent in 2018 and later joined BERSATU in 2019.

Political career
In the 2018 election, UMNO fielded him to contest the Libaran parliamentary seat, facing a new candidate Irwanshah Mustapa from the Sabah Heritage Party (WARISAN) and subsequently won.

Election results

Honours
  :
  Companion Class I of the Order of Malacca (DMSM) – Datuk (2005)

See also

 Libaran (federal constituency)

References 

Date of birth missing (living people)
Living people
People from Sabah
Malaysian Muslims
Malaysian United Indigenous Party politicians
Former United Malays National Organisation politicians
Independent politicians in Malaysia
Members of the Dewan Rakyat
21st-century Malaysian politicians
Year of birth missing (living people)